Pelham-Clinton-Hope may refer to:
Francis Pelham-Clinton-Hope, 8th Duke of Newcastle-under-Lyne (1866–1941), English nobleman
Henry Pelham-Clinton-Hope, 9th Duke of Newcastle-under-Lyne OBE, DL, JP (1907–1988), British peer and aviator

See also
Pelham (surname)
Clinton (surname)
Hope (surname)
Pelham-Clinton

Compound surnames
English-language surnames
Surnames of English origin